Johann Michael Feuchtmayer (the Younger) (sometimes spelled Johann Michael Feuchtmayr or Feichtmayr) (1709 – June 4, 1772) was a German stuccoworker and sculptor of the late Baroque period. He collaborated with the architects Johann Michael Fischer, Johann Joseph Christian, and Franz Joseph Spiegler on numerous ecclesiastical buildings in Upper Swabia. His stucco decoration in the Benedictine abbey church (designed by Fischer) of Ottobeuren is considered his crowning achievement.

Feuchtmayer was born into a family of artists in Wessobrunn, Bavaria. He and his uncle, the stuccoworker Franz Joseph Feuchtmayer (1660–1718); his uncle, the painter Johann Michael Feuchtmayer the Elder (1666–1713); his brother Franz Xaver Feuchtmayer the Elder (1705–1764); his cousin, the painter and sculptor Joseph Anton Feuchtmayer (1696–1770); and his nephew, Franz Xaver Feuchtmayer the Younger (b. 1735), comprise the Wessobrunner School.

Major works

Austria
Wilhering—Stiftskirche Mariä Himmelfahrt (stucco in transepts and choir)

Baden-Württemberg
Bad Säckingen—Convent Church of St. Fridolin (1751) (stucco)
Haigerloch—Pilgrimage Church of St. Anne (1753–1755) (stucco work and side altar design)
Kisslegg—Neues Schloss (New Castle) (1721–1727) (stucco figures of the Sibyls on the staircase)
Seeon im Chiemgau—Chapel of St. Nicholas at the Benedictine Monastery of St. Lambert (stucco)
Sigmaringen—Catholic Parish Church of St. John the Evangelist (altars)
Zwiefalten—Zwiefalten Abbey (1741–1747) (stucco)

Bavaria
Amorbach—Benedictine Abbey Church of St. Maria (high altar and other altars)
Augsburg—Dominican Church of St. Magdalena (1716) (stucco)
Dießen am Ammersee—Church of St. Maria (completed 1739) (stucco)
Ottobeuren—Benedictine Monastery Church of the Holy Trinity (1737–1766) (stucco)
Staffelstein—Pilgrimage Church of Vierzehnheiligen (stucco on the Gnadenaltar)
Würzburg—Wallfahrtskirche Mariä Heimsuchung (1747–1750) (stucco)

References

1709 births
1772 deaths
People from Weilheim-Schongau
German Baroque sculptors
German male sculptors